Angelina Jolie (born 1975) is an American film actress

Jolie may also refer to:
 Jolie (name), a given name and surname (and list of people with the name)
 Jolie (magazine), a Lahori fashion magazine
 Jolie (programming language), a programming language for microservices
 Jolie & the Wanted, an African country music band
 Al Jolson or Jolie, entertainer
 Angelina Pivarnick or Jolie, cast member of Jersey Shore
 Jolie, a character in Incarnations of Immortality
 Aptostichus angelinajolieae, the Angelina Jolie trapdoor spider

See also 
 Joli (disambiguation)
 Jolie Brise, a sailboat